Philippa Blair (born 1945) is a New Zealand artist. Her works are held in the collection of the Auckland Art Gallery Toi o Tāmaki, Museum of New Zealand Te Papa Tongarewa and the University of Auckland art collection.

Early life 
Philippa Blair was born in 1945 in Christchurch, New Zealand.

Education 
Blair studied at the University of Canterbury from 1965 to 1967, under Rudolf Gopas and Don Peebles. She graduated with a Diploma of Fine Arts (painting) in 1967. At age 22 Blair married and went to live at Wairoa, teaching art at the local college, before living in Australia for several years. It was at this point that she began to commit herself seriously to painting.

In 1976, Blair completed a Diploma of Teaching in Secondary School File Art at Secondary Teachers' College in Auckland, New Zealand.

Career 

Philippa Blair's early painting works produced while living in Australia include Open Window - Brisbane (1969) and Primary Reflection (Melbourne 1971). Initially, Blair's intuitive and expressionistic style was not readily accepted in New Zealand, but was accepted by Kees and Tina Hos who began exhibiting Blair's work at New Vision Gallery in Auckland from 1975.

Blair works primarily as a painter, and makes semi-abstract work. Her works from the 1980s are reminiscent of works by Jackson Pollock and Len Lye, which Blair was familiar with and admired for their 'movement' and 'fugitive' qualities.  She has worked as both a secondary school art teacher and university painting tutor from 1968 onward.

Philippa Blair moved from New Zealand to the United States in 1995 with her husband John Porter, and they lived at Venice Beach and San Pedro, before moving back to Auckland, New Zealand in 2015. Their daughter Alice Hutchison is an art curator and writer.

Blair has exhibited as a solo artist and in group shows widely in New Zealand and the United States, including:

Spaces, Mats and Carpets at New Vision Gallery, Auckand 1980. The works in this show were paintings built up through dense layers of splattered paint.
Packapoo at RKS Art, Auckland in 1980. 
Three from New Zealand: Philippa Blair, Christine Hellyar, Ralph Hotere (group exhibition with Christine Hellyar and Ralph Hotere) at Long Beach Museum of Art in 1990.
Philippa Blair, Survey 1987-1992 at the Centre for Contemporary Art, Hamilton in 1992.
Philippa Blair: Traverse: Recent Paintings, Drawings, Lithographs at Spencer Gallery Wickford, RI and Janne Land Gallery Wellington in 1999.
Transmotion: Drawings and Paintings at the DoubleVision Gallery, Los Angeles, California in 2001.
Between Heaven and Earth (group exhibition with Lawrence Abrahamsen, Fran Bull and Don Lewallen) at Walter Wickiser Gallery, New York in 2003.
Philippa Blair: A 10 Year Survey at Warwick Henderson Gallery, Auckland in 2004.
Crossings at PGgallery192, Christchurch in 2015.
Dancing Off Score at PGgallery192, Christchurch in 2018.

Residencies and awards 

 Queen Elizabeth II Arts Council Grants in 1980 and 1984.
 First New Zealander to participate in the artist-in-residence programme at the Canberra School of Art, 1984.

References 

1945 births
Living people
New Zealand women artists
University of Canterbury alumni
New Zealand painters
Ilam School of Fine Arts alumni
University of Auckland alumni
People from San Pedro, Los Angeles